Alfred Hart Everett (11 October 1848 – 18 June 1898) was a British civil servant and administrator in Borneo as well as being a naturalist and natural history collector.

Career
Everett was born on Norfolk Island to British parents: George, the doctor at the penal colony, from Wiltshire, and Anna-Maria, from Jersey. They left in 1851 to return to England via Tasmania, so he was educated in England. In 1869 he went to Sarawak in north-western Borneo in order to collect natural history specimens.  After two years there he entered the service of the Kingdom of Sarawak, as a Resident in the Baram district, under the White Rajahs.  In 1878 and 1879 he was engaged by the Royal Society and British Association to explore 'the Caves of Borneo' in search of the remains of ancient man. The explorations were made around Bau and Niah but were unsuccessful in their primary aim (although the orangutan jaw which later formed part of Piltdown Man may well have been one result). In 1885 he was appointed the Rajah’s Consul to the Court of the Sultan of Brunei. He later served in North Borneo in the administration of the British North Borneo Company.

In 1891, Everett became a member of the British Ornithologists' Union.  He never married.  He died in London.

Zoological collecting
Everett collected for the Marquess of Tweedale and Walter Rothschild, as well as others.  He is best known for the collections he made of birds and mammals in Borneo and the Philippines.

Legacy
Everett is commemorated in the names of several animals, including:

Birds
 Bornean spiderhunter (Arachnothera everetti)
 Brown-backed flowerpecker (Dicaeum everetti)
 Chestnut-crested yuhina (Staphida everetti)
 Everett's thrush (Zoothera everetti)
 Everett's white-eye (Zosterops everetti)
 Russet-capped tesia (Tesia everetti)
 Sumba buttonquail (Turnix everetti)
 Sumba hornbill (Rhyticeros everetti)
 Tanahjampea monarch (Monarcha everetti)
 Yellowish bulbul (Ixos everetti)

Mammals
 Bornean ferret-badger (Melogale everetti)
 Bornean mountain ground squirrel (Dremomys everetti)
 Mindanao treeshrew (Urogale everetti)
 Philippine forest rat (Rattus everetti)

Snakes
 Everett's reedsnake (Calamaria everetti)
 Jewelled kukri snake (Oligodon everetti)
 Sabah striped coralsnake (Calliophis intestinalis everetti)

Lizards
 Sphenomorphus alfredi 

Frogs
 Everett's treefrog (Litoria everetti)

Fish
 Clown barb (Puntius everetti)

References

Notes

Sources
 
 
 
 
 
 
 
 
 
 

1848 births
1898 deaths
Zoological collectors
British naturalists
British ornithologists
North Borneo Chartered Company administrators
British administrators in Sarawak
People from Norfolk Island